The 2004 MAC Championship Game was played on December 2, 2004, at Ford Field in Detroit, Michigan.  The game featured the winner of each division of the Mid-American Conference. The game featured the Miami RedHawks, of the East Division, and the Toledo Rockets, of the West Division. The Rockets beat the RedHawks 35–27.

References

Championship Game
MAC Championship Game
Miami RedHawks football games
Toledo Rockets football games
American football competitions in Detroit
December 2004 sports events in the United States
MAC Championship
2004 in Detroit